Puhatu Wetland Complex is a bog in Ida-Viru County, Estonia. 
The bog extends from northern bank of Lake Peipus to Auvere-Narva line. It is part of Estonia's largest mire system Agusalu-Puhatu.
The complex is protected (Puhatu Nature Reserve, Agusalu Nature Reserve).

The area of the bog is 57,079 ha.

See also 
Agusalu Nature Reserve
Puhatu Nature Reserve

References

Ida-Viru County
Bogs of Estonia